Michael L. Good is an American anesthesiologist and the CEO of University of Utah Health (U of U Health), Executive Dean of the Spencer Fox Eccles School of Medicine, and the A. Lorris Betz Senior Vice President of Health Sciences. He served as the interim president of the University of Utah from Feb-Sept. of 2021.

Early life and education
Born and raised in Waterford, Michigan, Good graduated from the University of Michigan with a bachelor's degree in computer and communication sciences. He also earned his medical degree from Michigan and then moved to Gainesville in 1984 to complete residency training in anesthesiology and a research fellowship at University of Florida, where he joined the College of Medicine faculty in 1988.

Career
In the 1980s, Good led a team of physicians and engineers that invented the Human Patient Simulator, previously called the Gainesville Anesthesia Simulator, a full-body computer-controlled mannequin simulator. In 1994, he became the chief of anesthesiology at the Malcom Randall VA Medical Center in Gainesville, Florida, and in 1998, chief of staff and system medical director for the North Florida South Georgia Veterans Health System. In 2005, he was named associate dean for clinical affairs and chief of staff for UF Health Shands Hospital and Shands AGH. Good served as the ninth Dean of the University of Florida College of Medicine from 2008-2018. During his tenure as medical school dean at Florida he built new facilities that helped to grow ambulatory practice visits, hospital admissions, surgical procedures and emergency department visits by 70 percent or more; grew annual NIH grant funding by 67 percent; and modernized medical education at UF with a new, state-of-the-art medical education facility, the George T. Harrell Medical Education Building.

University of Utah Health 
At U of U Health, Good works to assure the professional and educational success of more than 20,000 faculty, staff and students who make U of U Health one of the nation's premier centers of academic health sciences.

From 2018-2021, Good led the health system to develop a five-year strategy and played a critical role in leading Utah to be positioned as a national model in mental health care; created a partnership to develop an innovative medical education focusing on population health; secured a transformational gift for medical education and scientific research; began reforms to medical education; and led the health system's charge to declare systemic racism as a public health crisis.

Boards and Taskforces 
Good is chair-elect of the Association of Academic Health Centers (AAHC) board of directors, a member of the American and Utah Medical Associations, and the American and Utah Societies of Anesthesiologists. In addition to AAHC, he currently serves on the Council of Deans of the Association of American Medical Colleges and the board of directors for University of Utah Hospitals & Clinics

During the 2020 coronavirus pandemic, he served on Utah's Public Health and Economic Emergency Commission, and he chaired the commission's Medical Advisory Subcommittee.

References

External links
Orlando Sentinel article about Dr. Good's appointment
Info on Good
Independent Alligator article about Dr. Michael Good

Living people
University of Florida faculty
University of Michigan Medical School alumni
Year of birth missing (living people)